Burgundy is a dark red-purplish color. 

The color burgundy takes its name from the Burgundy wine  in France. When referring to the color, "burgundy" is not usually capitalized.

The color burgundy is similar to Bordeaux (#4C1C24), Merlot (#73343A), Berry (#A01641), and Redberry (#701f28). Burgundy is made of 50% red, 0% green, and 13% blue. The CMYK percentages are 0% cyan, 100% magenta, 75% yellow, 50% black.

The first recorded use of "burgundy" as a color name in English was in 1881. 


Variations

Vivid burgundy

In cosmetology, a brighter tone of burgundy called vivid burgundy is used for coloring hair.

Old burgundy

The color old burgundy is a dark tone of burgundy.
The first recorded use of old burgundy as a color name in English was in 1926.

See also
 Auburn (color)
 RAL 3005 Wine red
 Wine (color)
 Wine color, various colors of wine

References

External links 

Shades of brown
Shades of red
Shades of violet